The following is a list of airports that have had commercial/civil and international air service in the past and no longer have scheduled commercial/passenger operations.

Africa

Asia

Europe

North America

Oceania

South America

See also
List of cities with more than one commercial airport

References

Defunct